Aba Khel railway station is  located in Khyber Pakhtunkhwa, Pakistan.

See also
 List of railway stations in Pakistan
 Pakistan Railways

References

Railway stations in Bannu District
Railway stations on Bannu–Tank Branch Line